La Maddukelleng (c. 1700–1765) was a Buginese adventurer who served as supreme leader of Wajo in the second quarter of the 18th century.
La Maddukelleng is now regarded as a National Hero of Indonesia.

References

National Heroes of Indonesia
18th-century Indonesian people
Year of birth uncertain
1765 deaths